Justice Bronson may refer to:

Greene C. Bronson, associate justice and chief justice of the New York Supreme Court, and judge of the New York Court of Appeals
Harrison A. Bronson, associate justice of the North Dakota Supreme Court

See also
Cornelius M. Brosnan, associate justice of the Supreme Court of Nevada